Witley railway station is a station on the Portsmouth Direct Line in Surrey, England. It is  down the line from  via Woking.

Location
Witley is, equally with Milford to the north-east, a minor stop on the Portsmouth Direct Line 38½ miles (62 km) south-west of London Waterloo. When opened, it was named Witley and Chiddingfold.

Its nearest communities without major stations are Wormley, the southern part of Witley (the north of which is served by Milford railway station), Hambledon and Chiddingfold.

Services 
All services at Witley are operated by South Western Railway using  and  EMUs.

The typical off-peak service in trains per hour is:
 1 tph to  via 
 1 tph to 

References

External links 

Railway stations in Surrey
DfT Category E stations
Former London and South Western Railway stations
Railway stations in Great Britain opened in 1859
Railway stations served by South Western Railway